Puhung station is a metro station on the Mangyongdae Line of the Pyongyang Metro. It is the southern terminus of the Chollima Line. Before the rules were relaxed in 2010, it was one of the only two stations that tourists could visit, the other one being Yonggwang station, because these two stations are the most finely decorated in the system. These two stations were also the last two to be completed.

Puhung station features murals entitled The Great Leader Kim Il-sung Among Workers, A Morning of Innovation, and Song of a Bumper Crop.

References

External links
 
 360° interactive panorama inside Puhung station

Pyongyang Metro stations
Murals in North Korea
Railway stations opened in 1987
1987 establishments in North Korea